Justin Eilers (born 13 June 1988) is a German professional footballer who plays as a forward for Germania Halberstadt.

Career
Born in Braunschweig, Eilers made his professional debut on 13 September 2008 for hometown club Eintracht Braunschweig in a match against Kickers Offenbach.

After leaving Braunschweig in 2009, Eilers went back into semi-professional football until signing with Dynamo Dresden of the 3. Liga on 20 June 2014. He was voted "Player of the Season" for the 2015–16 3. Liga season.

In April 2016, Werder Bremen announced Eilers would be joining the club on a three-year contract in the summer. In the first half of the 2016–17 season, he suffered from a hip injury and underwent a groin operation which, in connection with the resulting training deficit, kept him out of action. In the second half of the season, he played in the club's reserves to regain fitness and match practice before he suffered another injury tearing his anterior cruciate and medial collateral ligaments in May 2017.

In June 2018 Apollon Smyrnis announced the signing of Eilers. In December, after making one appearance which came on the season's first matchday, he agreed the termination of his contract.

On 24 January 2019, Eilers signed a contract with Sportfreunde Lotte for the rest of the season. Due to persistent hip problems he was limited to two substitute appearances and left the club at the end of the season.

In September 2020, Eilers moved to SC Verl, newly promoted to the 3. Liga, on a one-year contract with an optional extension.

In the 2021–22 season he played for Hallescher FC.

Eilers joined Regionalliga Nordost side Germania Halberstadt in August 2022.

Personal life
In November 2019, Eilers announced he had 
registered as insolvent.

Honours
Individual
 3. Liga topscorer: 2016

References

External links
 
 
 

1988 births
Living people
Sportspeople from Braunschweig
German footballers
Footballers from Lower Saxony
Association football forwards
Eintracht Braunschweig II players
Eintracht Braunschweig players
VfL Bochum II players
Goslarer SC 08 players
VfL Wolfsburg II players
Dynamo Dresden players
SV Werder Bremen players
SV Werder Bremen II players
Apollon Smyrnis F.C. players
Sportfreunde Lotte players
SC Verl players
Hallescher FC players
VfB Germania Halberstadt players
3. Liga players
Regionalliga players
Football League (Greece) players
German expatriate footballers
German expatriate sportspeople in Greece
Expatriate footballers in Greece